This is a list of the players who were on the rosters of the given teams who participated in the 2008 Beijing Olympics for Men's Basketball.

Group A

Argentina
The following is the Argentina roster in the men's basketball tournament of the 2008 Summer Olympics.

Australia
The following is the Australia roster in the men's basketball tournament of the 2008 Summer Olympics.

Croatia
The following is the Croatia roster in the men's basketball tournament of the 2008 Summer Olympics.

Iran
The following is the Iran roster in the men's basketball tournament of the 2008 Summer Olympics.

Lithuania
The following is the Lithuania roster in the men's basketball tournament of the 2008 Summer Olympics.

Russia
The following is the Russia roster in the men's basketball tournament of the 2008 Summer Olympics.

Group B

Angola
The following is the Angola roster in the men's basketball tournament of the 2008 Summer Olympics.

China
The following is the China roster in the men's basketball tournament of the 2008 Summer Olympics.

Germany
The following is the Germany roster in the men's basketball tournament of the 2008 Summer Olympics.

Greece
The following is the Greece roster in the men's basketball tournament of the 2008 Summer Olympics.

Spain
The following is the Spain roster in the men's basketball tournament of the 2008 Summer Olympics.

United States

The following is the United States roster in the men's basketball tournament of the 2008 Summer Olympics.

See also
Wheelchair basketball at the 2008 Summer Paralympics – Rosters

References

Squads, men's final
2008